Noya Bar Am (or Baram; born 1 September 1996) is an Israeli sailor.

2020 Tokyo Olympics
Baram represented Israel in the 2020 Tokyo Olympics alongside Shahar Tibi, competing in the Women’s Two Person Dinghy events.

References

External links
 
 
 
 

1996 births
Living people
Israeli female sailors (sport)
Sailors at the 2020 Summer Olympics – 470
Olympic sailors of Israel